Nadjib Vassiriki Cissé (born 22 December 2000) is a French professional footballer who plays as a defender for Ligue 2 club Quevilly-Rouen.

Personal life 
Born in France, Cissé is of Malian descent.

References

External links 
 
 

2000 births
Living people
French footballers
Association football defenders
Stade de Reims players
US Quevilly-Rouen Métropole players
Ligue 2 players
Championnat National 3 players
French sportspeople of Malian descent